Pauwasi may refer to:

Pauwasi languages
East Pauwasi languages
West Pauwasi languages
South Pauwasi languages
Pauwasi River